Petaluma North station is a planned Sonoma–Marin Area Rail Transit station in Petaluma, California located at Corona Boulevard and North McDowell Avenue. The station was planned as an infill station to be constructed after the initial phase of the system's construction had been completed. The site may include a 150-space parking facility. 

SMART estimated construction costs for the station at $11 million in 2019. In June 2020, the SMART Board of Directors authorized $8 million from the sale of a district-owned property to be used for design and construction of the station. However, in January 2021, the Petaluma City Council rejected a housing development tied to the station project, placing the station's future in doubt.

In July 2022, the city won a $10 million state grant for construction of the station. The city and the Sonoma County Transportation Authority each contributed $2 million for the station's construction, bringing the construction budget to $14 million.

References

External links
SMART - Stations

Future Sonoma–Marin Area Rail Transit stations
Petaluma, California
Sonoma-Marin Area Rail Transit stations in Sonoma County
Railway stations scheduled to open in 2024